Machevna Bay is a bay in Koryak Okrug of Kamchatka Krai, Russia, located approximately  (by air) north of Tilichiki.  Machevna River flows into this bay.

Bays of Kamchatka Krai